|}

This is a list of electoral district results of the 1914 Western Australian election.

Results by Electoral district

Albany

Avon

Beverley

Boulder

Brownhill-Ivanhoe

Bunbury

Canning

Claremont

Collie

Coolgardie

Cue

East Perth

Forrest

Fremantle 

 Preferences were not distributed.

Gascoyne

Geraldton

Greenough

Guildford

Hannans

Irwin

Kalgoorlie

Kanowna

Katanning

Kimberley

Leederville

Menzies

Moore

Mount Leonora

Mount Magnet

Mount Margaret

Murchison

Murray-Wellington

Nelson

North Perth 

|- style="background-color:#E9E9E9"
! colspan="6" style="text-align:left;" |After distribution of preferences

 Preferences were not distributed to completion.

North-East Fremantle

Northam 

 Preferences were not distributed.

Perth

Pilbara

Pingelly

Roebourne

South Fremantle

Subiaco

Sussex

Swan

Toodyay

Wagin

West Perth

Williams-Narrogin

Yilgarn

York

See also 

 1914 Western Australian state election
 Members of the Western Australian Legislative Assembly, 1914–1917

References 

Results of Western Australian elections
1914 elections in Australia